Pete Johnson (born Willie James Hammock on March 2, 1954) is an American former professional football player who was a running back for eight seasons in the National Football League (NFL), primarily with the Cincinnati Bengals. He played college football at Ohio State University under head coach

Early years
Born in Fort Valley, Georgia and raised by his great-grandparents, Johnson attended Peach County High School for three years where he played football. Upon the death of his great-grandfather, he moved to New York to live with his mother where he graduated from Long Beach High School in Long Beach, New York, playing football for his senior season.

College career
Johnson played fullback at Ohio State from 1973 through 1976. In 1973, starting fullback Champ Henson was injured and converted linebacker Bruce Elia was named to start in Henson's place. By the end if that season, freshman Johnson had worked his way up the depth chart. Elia returned to the linebacker corps in 1974 and Henson and Johnson alternated at fullback.

Although two-time Heisman Trophy winner Archie Griffin got most of the carries at tailback from 1972 to 1975, the Ohio State fullbacks still got the ball frequently and were expected to be major contributors, particularly in short-yardage situations.  In 1972 the team's leading scorer was Henson, and in 1973 it was Elia. Johnson's best season was in 1975. Even though Griffin led the team with 1,450 rushing yards, Johnson still rushed for 1,059 yards and set single OSU single season records for rushing touchdowns (25) and scoring (156 points).

One of Johnson's more notable performances was in his junior season against North Carolina. While Griffin rushed for 157 yards, Johnson rushed for 148 yards and set a school record with  He finished his career at Ohio State with 2,308 rushing yards and a school record 58 touchdowns (also a Big Ten record). His 348 points was a Buckeyes' record until surpassed by kicker Mike Nugent's 356 points 

In 2000, Johnson was selected for the Buckeyes' All-Century Team, and he was inducted into the OSU Athletics  in 2007, presented during halftime of the Akron game

NFL career
A bruising runner and competent blocker, Johnson was a mainstay in the Bengals backfield. He was the team's leading rusher for all seven seasons he played for them, and scored 12 or more rushing touchdowns in three different seasons. His best season was in 1981, where he made his only Pro Bowl selection.

In the postseason, Johnson helped the team record their first ever playoff win by rushing for 45 yards, catching 3 passes for 23 yards, and scoring a touchdown in the Bengals'  divisional victory over the Buffalo Bills. In the AFC title game (known in NFL lore as the Freezer Bowl), Johnson rushed for 80 yards and a touchdown, while also catching a 14-yard reception as the team defeated the high-scoring San Diego Chargers  to earn their first Super Bowl appearance. Cincinnati lost Super Bowl XVI at the Pontiac Silverdome  to the San Francisco 49ers, who limited Johnson to just 36 rushing yards and 8 receiving yards.

In 1984, Johnson was traded to the Chargers in exchange for running back James Brooks. He left Cincinnati as their all-time leader in rushing yards (5,421), touchdowns (70), and second all-time scorer with 420 points. Johnson spent the first three games of the 1984 season with Chargers and spent the final 13 games with Miami before retiring after the season ended.

Johnson has an NFL-record three straight games with at least one receiving and one rushing touchdown.

Drug charges 
In , Johnson and another Bengals player testified in exchange for immunity from prosecution that they had purchased cocaine from a Cincinnati plumber, and he was suspended by the NFL for four games. In 1987, he was indicted by a federal grand jury on four cocaine-related charges—and at the time of his indictment, he was selling cars in Miami, according to The New York Times archive; he was found not guilty by a Columbus jury in February 1988.

See also
 List of NCAA Division I FBS players with at least 50 career rushing touchdowns
 List of NCAA major college football yearly scoring leaders

References

External links
Ohio State Buckeyes – Pete Johnson
College stats – Pete Johnson

1954 births
Living people
People from Fort Valley, Georgia
Players of American football from Georgia (U.S. state)
American football running backs
Long Beach High School (New York) alumni
Ohio State Buckeyes football players
Cincinnati Bengals players
San Diego Chargers players
Miami Dolphins players
American Conference Pro Bowl players